The Norwegian Authors' Union (DnF) is an association of Norwegian authors. It was established in 1893 to promote Norwegian literature and protect Norwegian authors' professional and economic interests. DnF also works in solidarity with persecuted writers internationally.

As of 2004 the association had 513 members. The author Heidi Marie Kriznik has led the organization since 2017.

Organization activities 
The Norwegian Authors' Union Literary Council annually awards a number of government and independently established scholarships to both members and non-members. The Literary Council consists of nine members and provides counsel on all matters of literary art, in addition to decisions on awards. A number of famous Norwegian authors have been members of the council.

List of leaders
 1894– Gustav Storm (non-fiction section)
 1894–1896 Arne Garborg (fiction section)
 1894–1896 Andreas Aubert
 1896–1900 Jacob Hilditch
 1900–1903 Jacob Breda Bull
 1903– Moltke Moe
 1903–1905 Gerhard Gran
 1905–1908 Vilhelm Krag
 1908–1910 Jacob Hilditch
 1910–1913 Hans Aanrud
 1913–1916 Peter Egge
 1917–1919 Nils Collett Vogt
 1920–1922 Johan Bojer
 1922– Ole Lie Singdahlsen
 1922–1923 Oskar Braaten
 1923–1928 Arnulf Øverland
 1928–1932 Ronald Fangen
 1933– Oskar Braaten
 1934– Johan Bojer
 1935– Peter Egge
 1936–1940 Sigrid Undset
 1940– Georg Brochmann
 1941–1945 Alex Brinchmann
 1946–1965 Hans Heiberg
 1965–1971 Odd Bang-Hansen
 1971–1975 Ebba Haslund
 1975–1977 Bjørn Nilsen
 1977–1981 Camilla Carlson
 1982–1985 Johannes Heggland
 1985–1987 Karsten Alnæs
 1987–1991 Toril Brekke
 1991–1997 Thorvald Steen
 1997–1999 Inger Elisabeth Hansen
 1999–2001 Karsten Alnæs
 2001–2005 Geir Pollen
 2005–2012 Anne Oterholm
 2012–2017 Sigmund Løvåsen
2017– Heidi Marie Kriznik

References

External links
Official website 
	
Organisations based in Oslo
Organizations established in 1893
Norwegian writers' organisations
Norwaco